The Kelashin Stele (also Kelishin or Keli-Shin; from Kurdish Language: Blue Stone) found in Kelashin, Iraq, bears an important Urartian-Assyrian bilingual text dating to c. 800 BC, first described by Friedrich Eduard Schulz in 1827. Part of Schulz's notes were lost when he was killed by Kurdish "bandits", and later expeditions were either prevented by weather conditions or Kurdish brigands, so that a copy (latex squeeze) of the inscription could only be made in 1951 by G. Cameron, and again in 1976 by an Italian party under heavy military protection.

The inscription describes the acquisition of the city of Musasir (Ardini) by the Urartian king Ishpuini.

References
Warren C. Benedict, The Urartian-Assyrian Inscription of Kelishin, Journal of the American Oriental Society, Vol. 81, No. 4 (1961), pp. 359–385.

9th-century BC steles
1827 archaeological discoveries
Hurro-Urartian languages
Akkadian literature
Ancient Near East steles